Stig-Göran Henriksson (born 1955) is a Swedish politician and former member of the Riksdag, the national legislature. A member of the Left Party, he represented Västmanland County in September 2002 and between September 2014 and October 2017.

Henriksson is the son of merchant Evert Henriksson and Elsa Henriksson (née Wennström). He was educated in Satter, Yrttivaara, Hakkas, Gällivare and Malmberget. He studied philosophy at Uppsala University and physiotherapy in Uppsala. He worked at Fagersta hospital between 1980 and 1982 and between 1983 and 2010. He worked for Mitt Hjärta AB between 2010 and 2016. He was a member of the municipal council in Fagersta Municipality from 1982 to 2019. He left the Riksdag in 2017 after he was refused leave to care for his stepchildren while his wife was working abroad. He retired from politics in 2019 and moved to Stockholm to be closer to his children and grandchildren.

References

1955 births
Living people
Members of the Riksdag 2002–2006
Members of the Riksdag 2014–2018
Members of the Riksdag from the Left Party (Sweden)
People from Fagersta Municipality